Senator Doll may refer to:

Henry W. Doll (1870–?), New York State Senate
John P. Doll (born 1961), Minnesota State Senate